Campos del Paraíso is a municipality in the province of Cuenca, Castile-La Mancha, Spain. It has a population of 1,069.

References

External links

Municipalities in the Province of Cuenca